Dětkovice may refer to places in the Czech Republic:

Dětkovice (Prostějov District), a municipality and village in the Olomouc Region
Dětkovice (Vyškov District), a municipality and village in the South Moravian Region
Dětkovice, a village and part of Ludmírov in the Olomouc Region